StudSat-2 (STUDent SATellite-2) is a nanosatellite under development with Studsat-2 Consortium and  Visvesvaraya Technological University (VTU) for proving the concept of Inter-satellite link (ISL). The main goal of the StudSat-2 project is to develop a low-cost small satellite, capable of operating small scientific or technological payloads where real time connectivity is provided by inter-satellite links.

Team STUDSAT is coming up with another milestone, Project STUDSAT-2, India's First Twin Nano Satellite Mission to prove Inter Satellite Communication. The student group which was inspired by the Project STUDSAT-1 are the pioneers to this project. Project STUDSAT-2 consisting of two Nano Satellites STUDSAT 2A & 2B has multiple cutting edge technologies. The satellites are in along-the-track constellation architecture with the STUDSAT-2A sending position and velocity data to the STUDSAT-2B through Inter Satellite Link.

Objectives

Primary

 To demonstrate In-Orbit Separation Mechanism for STUDSAT 2A/2B.
 To design, develop and implement Drag Sail technology in STUDSAT 2B for de-orbiting.
 To demonstrate Inter Satellite Communication.
 To demonstrate Solar Panel and Antenna Deployment mechanism in a Nano satellite.
 To capture images of Earth with a CMOS multispectral camera.

Secondary
 To create a modular architecture of small satellite which can be used in future missions.
 To demonstrate satellite development by a team of under graduate students from seven engineering colleges.
 To promote space technology in educational institutions and encourage research and development in miniaturized satellites.
 To bridge the gap between academic institutes, research organizations and industries.

Studsat-2 consortium
Studsat-2 consortium consists of seven Engineering colleges across South India bound by an MOU in order to sponsor the project financially. The consortium comprises following colleges.
Nitte Meenakshi Institute of Technology, Bangalore. [Lead College]
M S Ramaiah Institute of Technology, Bangalore.
RNS Institute of Technology, Bangalore.
N.M.A.M. Institute of Technology, Nitte.
Nagarjuna College of Engineering and Technology, Bangalore.
Siddaganga Institute of Technology, Tumkur
Sri Siddhartha Institute of Technology, Tumkur.

Description
The Twin-Nano satellite prototype resembles a small rectangular cube, with traditional length dimensions of (30 cm x 30 cm x 30 cm), weighing between almost 8.5kg to 9.5kg, and a volume of 8L to 9L. The satellite is built with harmonial working of the following subsystems

 Communication sub-system.
 Power generation and distribution sub-system.
 Attitude Determination and Control sub-system.
 On Board Command and Data Handling.
 Payload(Automatic Identification System).
 Mechanical Structure.

A Ground Station has been designed in order to communicate with the satellite. The Ground Station NASTRAC (Nitte Amateur Satellite Tracking Centre) which is established in NMIT was inaugurated by Dr K. Radhakrishnan, the Ex-Chairman of ISRO. All the above subsystems are designed by students indigenously.

See also
 StudSat
 List of CubeSats

References

External links
 https://web.archive.org/web/20111014133438/http://nmit.ac.in/Centerforsmallsatellite.aspx?LinkId=407

Student satellites
Mini satellites of India
Proposed satellites